Andrzej Sobolewski (born 9 October 1951, Augustów) is a Polish physicist and academic working at the Institute of Physics of the Polish Academy of Sciences in Warsaw. He is a fellow of the Alexander von Humboldt Foundation and Foundation for Polish Science as well as a member of the National Science Centre.

Life and career
He was born on 9 October 1951, in Augustów, Polish People's Republic and attended the Grzegorz Piramowicz High School No. 2. In 1977, he graduated in biophysics from the University of Warsaw. Since 1976, he has been working at the Institute of Physics of the Polish Academy of Sciences as an assistant professor and since 1991 as a professor.

At the Faculty of Physics, he received his doctoral degree in 1981 and habilitation in 1989. Between 1985-1986, he was on scholarship at the Ludwig Maximilian University of Munich. He was also granted an academic scholarship at the University of Arizona in 1994 and the University of Düsseldorf in 1998 and 1999. Since 1990, he has been collaborating with Wolfgang Domcke from the University of Munich. His main area of interest is theoretical physical chemistry. Together with Domcke, he made important contributions to the identification and description of the mechanism responsible for photostability of living matter. This mechanism of radiationless deactivation of electron-excited states of DNA and protein, known as the Sobolewski-Domcke scenario, furthers the understanding of why the fundamental biological structures are relatively resistant to UV radiation. This discovery proved to be of great importance for the research into the beginnings of life on Earth because it explains in what ways the survival and development of living organisms was possible despite strong UV radiation on the Earth at that time.

Sobolewski is also a member of the Warsaw Scientific Society. In 2014, he was appointed member of the council of the National Science Centre (NCN).

Awards
Carl Friedrich von Siemens Research Award of the Alexander von Humboldt Foundation (2016)
Officer's Cross of the Order of Polonia Restituta (2013)
Smoluchowski-Warburg Award (2009)
Copernicus Award (2008)
Prize of the Foundation for Polish Science (2007)

Publications
Sobolewski is an author of about 130 original publications in international journals and chapters in three monographs, some of which include:

Excited-state hydrogen detachment and hydrogen transfer driven by repulsive πσ* states: A new paradigm for nonradiative decay in aromatic biomolecules, Phys. Chem. Chem. Phys. 4 (2002) 1093
Hydrated hydronium: a cluster model of the solvated electron?, Phys. Chem. Chem. Phys. 4 (2002) 4
Unraveling the molecular mechanisms of photoacidity, Science 302 (2003) 1693
Efficient deactivation of a model base pair via excited-state hydrogen transfer, Science 306 (2004) 1765
Tautomeric selectivity of the excited-state lifetime of guanine/cytosine base pairs: The role of electron-driven proton-transfer processes, Proc. Natl. Acad. Sci. 102 (2005)17903
Ab initio studies on the radiationless decay mechanisms of the lowest excited singlet states of 9H-adenine, J. Am. Chem. Soc. 127 (2005) 6257
Photoinduced water splitting with oxotitanium porphyrin: a computational study, Phys. Chem. Chem. Phys. 14 (2012) 12807
Molecular mechanisms of the photostability of life, Phys. Chem. Chem. Phys. 12 (2010) 4897
Reversible molecular switch driven by excited-state hydrogen transfer, Phys. Chem. Chem. Phys. 10 (2008) 1243
Peptide Deactivation: Spectroscopy meets theory, Nature Chemistry 5 (2013) 257

See also
Prize of the Foundation for Polish Science
Science in Poland
List of Poles

References

Living people
1951 births
People from Augustów
20th-century Polish physicists
Recipients of the Order of Polonia Restituta
21st-century Polish physicists